APB may refer to:

Law enforcement and military
All-points bulletin, a broadcast (about a wanted suspect or missing person) issued from one US law enforcement agency to another
Acquisition Program Baseline, in the United States military

Media
"A.P.B.", a song on Womack & Womack's 1984 album Love Wars
APB (band), a Scottish band
Apoptygma Berzerk, a Norwegian electronic music group
APB (1987 video game)
APB: All Points Bulletin, a 2010 massively multiplayer online game for Microsoft Windows
APB (TV series), an American television series that aired in 2017

Organizations
Accounting Principles Board, the former authoritative body of the American Institute of Certified Public Accountants
Alliance for Brazil
Asia Pacific Breweries
Atrocities Prevention Board, an interagency body in the U.S. government that evaluates long-term risks of genocide
Auditing Practices Board, a committee of the Financial Reporting Council

Science and technology
6-APB, a psychoactive compound similar in structure to MDA
Advanced Peripheral Bus, a type of microcontroller bus
Atrial premature beat, a cardiac dysrhythmia

Other uses
The Albany Pine Bush, an inland pine barrens
Appley Bridge railway station's station code
A version of the Stechkin automatic pistol with integrated silencer
Aft pressure bulkhead, part of commercial airliners or other planes that have pressurized cabins

See also
All Points Bulletin (disambiguation)